Carmichael may refer to:
 Carmichael (surname)

Other
 Clan Carmichael, Scottish clan
 Carmichael, California, United States
 Carmichael coal mine, a proposed mine in Central Queensland, Australia
 Carmichael (crater), a lunar crater
 Carmichael (manufacturer), Worcester manufacturer of fire engines
 Rural Municipality of Carmichael No. 109, a rural municipality in Saskatchewan
 Carmichael number, a special kind of number in number theory named for mathematician Robert Carmichael
Carmichael, Saskatchewan, Canada
 Carmichael, South Lanarkshire, a village in Scotland
 J and C Carmichael, Scottish engineering company
 Carmichael College, an educational institution in Rangpur, Bangladesh.

See also 
 Karmichael Hunt  New Zealand-born Australian professional multi-code  football player